Olimpia delle Tofane is the classic women's World Cup downhill ski course in Cortina d'Ampezzo, Italy. It debuted  at the 1956 Winter Olympics, hosting the men's downhill.

Olympics

Men's events

World Championships

Men's events

Women's events

World Cup

Men

Women

Course sections 
Rifugio Pomedes, Tofanaschuss, Duca d'Aosta, Delta, Primo Muro, Secondo Muro, Traverse Diagonale, Gran Curvone, Scarpadon, Festis, Pale di Rumerlo, Final Traverse

Club5+ 
In 1986, elite Club5 was originally founded by prestigious classic downhill organizers: Kitzbühel, Wengen, Garmisch, Val d’Isère and Val Gardena/Gröden, with goal to bring alpine ski sport on the highest levels possible.

Later over the years other classic longterm organizers joined the now named Club5+: Alta Badia, Cortina, Kranjska Gora, Maribor, Lake Louise, Schladming, Adelboden, Kvitfjell, St.Moritz and Åre.

References

External links

Skiing in Italy